Decken's horseshoe bat (Rhinolophus deckenii) is a species of horseshoe bat. It is found in Kenya and Tanzania. Its natural habitats are tropica and subtropical moist lowland and montane forest, moist savanna, caves and other subterranean habitats.

Taxonomy
Decken's horseshoe bat was described as a new species in 1867 by German naturalist Wilhelm Peters. The holotype had been collected in Tanzania. The eponym of the species name "deckenii" is Karl Klaus von der Decken, a German baron and explorer of eastern Africa; Decken collected the specimen that Peters used to describe the species. At times, it has been treated as a subspecies of Geoffroy's horseshoe bat (R. clivosus).

Description
Decken's horseshoe bat is considered medium-sized for an African horseshoe bat.

Range and habitat
Decken's horseshoe bat is found only in East Africa, where it has been documented in Kenya and Tanzania. Little is known about its habitat preferences, but it is associated with forested land.

Conservation
As of 2008, it is evaluated as a near-threatened species by the IUCN. Threats that it faces included habitat destruction due to deforestation for agricultural clearing, as well as logging. The species is likely experiencing a significant population decline, and is close to qualifying for the vulnerable designation.

References

Rhinolophidae
Mammals described in 1867
Taxonomy articles created by Polbot
Taxa named by Wilhelm Peters
Bats of Africa